Panagiotis Beglitis (Greek: Παναγιώτης Μπεγλίτης) (born 25 February 1957, Velo) is a Greek politician, who from 2004-07 was a Member of the European Parliament (MEP) for the Panhellenic Socialist Movement, part of the Party of European Socialists.

In the 2007 Greek legislative election he was elected to the Hellenic Parliament for Corinthia, and consequently resigned from the European Parliament. Beglitis served as Minister for National Defence between 17 June and 11 November 2011, and as Alternate Minister between 7 October 2009 and 16 June 2011.

References

External links
 

1958 births
Living people
PASOK politicians
Greek MPs 2007–2009
Greek MPs 2009–2012
PASOK MEPs
MEPs for Greece 2004–2009
Ministers of National Defence of Greece
People from Velo